, real name Makoto Tonami (戸並誠 Tonami Makoto), is a Japanese businessman, political activist and perennial candidate. He was born in Nagoya, grew up in a struggling family, and attended Kyoto University. He spent 25 years as an executive at the trading company Itochu, where he built a rare-earth metals trading business and ultimately retired early with a 120 million yen severance package. He went into politics after his retirement. He now manages the Smile Therapy Association in Akasaka, Tokyo. Akasaka claims to have personal assets of billions of yen, which he uses to cover the cost of his political campaigns.

In these elections he has become known for flamboyant election speeches, often in costume, and for staging impromptu concerts in public areas such as central Shibuya. His official election speech broadcasts, in which he stressed the importance of smiling while wearing an outlandish costume such as Superman or a space alien, became popular on YouTube and other video sites.

His campaigns through 2012 cost a total of around 30-40 million yen; his 2012 run for governor of Tokyo alone cost around 5 million yen even though he chose not to print election posters. Akasaka considered staying out of the Tokyo gubernatorial election in 2014, as profits from his rare-earth trading were down and he was less willing to front the 3 million yen bond required to run. He finally announced that he would run after an outpouring of comments on Twitter urging him to do so. He wrote: "There are Mac fans throughout the world, not just among the voters of Tokyo, but even in Hollywood and Lausanne. They are looking forward to my election video."

Tonami was indicted for tax fraud in 2010 on charges that he concealed 234 million yen in income over a span of three years, and received a suspended prison sentence.

References

External links
 Smile Party (Japanese)
 Mac Akasaka weblog (Japanese)

1948 births
Living people
Japanese political candidates
Tokyo gubernatorial candidates
Itochu people
Kyoto University alumni
Japanese people convicted of tax crimes
Politicians from Tokyo
Japanese politicians convicted of crimes
20th-century Japanese businesspeople